Swamp football (sometimes called Swamp soccer, and Suopotkupallo in Finnish) is a form of association football that is played in bogs or swamps. The sport is said to come from Finland where it initially was used as an exercise activity for athletes and soldiers since playing on soft bog is physically demanding. Swamp soccer is especially popular in the Kainuu region. The first organized championship was the 1998 Finnish championship and was the brainchild of Jyrki Väänänen nicknamed "The Swamp Baron". There are currently an estimated 300 swamp football teams around the world.

The officially recognized global body for Swamp Soccer is Swamp Soccer UK Ltd, based in Scotland. As well as managing the Swamp Soccer World Cup, Swamp Soccer UK has a mission to introduce the sport to other countries. Lead by Stewart Miller, in the last few years from 2011 to 2015, official tournaments have been launched in China (Beijing), Turkey (Istanbul) and India (Mumbai).

Swamp football in the UK

In 2008 the Dunoon competition moved to nearby Strachur to become the World Cup. 43 teams entered the tournament, which was contested over 3 days. Top honors went to Team Rambos in the men's competition with Belgium's De Rode Modderduivels winning the mixed competition.

In 2009, sponsored by FRijj (part of the Dairy Crest Group), the world cup competition attracted 100 teams from 25 countries. FRijj and Swamp Soccer ran an innovative on pack promotion which included augmented reality - the first time an established UK brand had used this medium for a national promotion.

In 2011, the tournament moved to Edinburgh and 2012 it was in Inverness, the capital city of the Scottish Highlands.
The Swamp Soccer World Cup moved back to its spiritual home, to the Dunoon area in 2013. In 2014 Ardbeg single malt whisky became the title sponsor.

In 2016, the Swamp Soccer World Cup moved to Istanbul in Turkey.

Rules
The standard football rules have been modified significantly to suit the demanding sport:

 The game is played in two halves of 12 minutes
 Corner kicks, penalties and throw-ins are made by dropping the ball on to a chosen foot
 There is no off-side rule
 There are 6 players on the field, with no limit on the size of squads
 The players can be substituted as often as they want
 The World Cup is held in Scotland annually, usually on the last weekend in June
 World Championship is held in Finland annually, usually in the middle of June a week before World Cup

References

External links

Swamp Soccer Europe
Swamp soccer world championships in Finland
The world cup swamp soccer tournament in Scotland
BBC's web page on swamp football and its rules
Images from a Scottish tournament
The Icelandic swamp soccer page

Association football variants
Sports originating in Finland